is a Japanese football player for Chiangmai United in Thai League 2.

His younger brother Yuji is also a professional footballer currently playing for Gamba Osaka.

Club statistics
Updated to 18 February 2021.

References

External links

Profile at FC Gifu
Yuto Ono at Facebook
Yuto Ono at Instagram
Yuto Ono at Twitter

1991 births
Living people
Association football people from Kanagawa Prefecture
Japanese footballers
J2 League players
Yuto Ono
FC Gifu players
Yuto Ono
Association football midfielders